Linaluk Island is one of the islands in the Arctic Archipelago in the Northwest Territories, Canada.  It is located in the south-east of Prince Albert Sound, just north of the Wollaston Peninsula, Victoria Island.

Uninhabited islands of the Northwest Territories